MDL may mean:

 Mazagon Dock Limited, an Indian shipyard
 MDL (programming language), derived from LISP
 The extension for Valve's Source, Source 2 and ID Software's IDTech game engines proprietary model file format
 Method Detection limit of a chemical substance
 Mobile driver's license, a mobile app that replaces a physical driver's license
 MDL Information Systems, company formerly named "Molecular Design Limited"
 Military Demarcation Line, a truce border line between North and South Korea
 Minimum description length, a principle for inductive inference in information theory
 Fayyad & Irani's MDL method, a discretization method
 Moldovan leu, the currency of Moldova
 Multidistrict Litigation, US consolidation of complex litigation
 Museum of Dartmoor Life, Oakhampton, Devon, England
 Roman numeral for 1550
 IATA airport code for Mandalay International Airport